Grönwalls is a dansband from Hässleholm in Sweden. The band won the Swedish dansband championships in Sunne in August 1992. Famous hit songs include Du ringde från Flen from 1993 and Ett liv tillsammans, written by Calle Kindbom and Peo Pettersson, topping Svensktoppen in 1995, as well as Regn i mitt hjärta from 1996.

Several band members also participated in the side project Grönrock, which in mid 2008 played with Dan Hylander. In October 2008, the band announced a break from New Year 2008-2009.

In November–December 2009, the band announced its comeback.

Members

Members
Monia Sjöström - vocals
Niclas Brandt - keyboard, Members
Mikael Andersen - acoustic guitar, Members
Peter Clarinsson - drums
Jonas Zetterman - guitar
Sid Andersson - bass

Former members
Camilla Lindén - vocals, 1999–2001
Madlén Trasthe - vocals, 2001–2004
Thomas Wennerström - bass, 2003–2008
Mattias Fredriksson- bass, 2008–2009
Johan Fredriksson - drums, 2008–2009
Andy Lundberg - drums, 2000–2008

Discocraphy

Studio albums
Du har det där - 1992
Högt i det blå - 1993
En plats i solen - 1994
Jag ringer upp - 1995
Bara vi och månen - 1997
Vem - 1999
Visa vad du går för - 2000

Compilation albums / Other albums
Du ringde från Flen - 1994
Ett liv tillsammans - 1996
På begäran - 1997
Regn i mitt hjärta - 1998
I varje andetag - 1999
Tillbaks igen - 2000
En på miljonen - 2005
Du ringde från Flen - 2008
Favoriter 1 - 2011

Svensktoppen songs
Du ringde från Flen - 1993
Du har det där - 1993
Ett liv tillsammans - 1995
En plats i Solen - 1995
Jag ringer upp - 1996
Regn i mitt hjärta - 1997
Nu i dag - 1997
Bara vi och månen - 1997
I varje andetag - 1998–1999
Vem - 1999–2000
Ännu en dag - 2000
Tillbaks igen" - 2000

Tested for Svensktoppen, failed to enter chart
För den kärlek jag känner - 1992 (8 November) (single 1992)
Vägen till mitt hjärta - 1998–1999
Rör vid mig - 2000
Stjärnorna vet - 2002
Falling in Love - 2006

References

Dansbands